Madīnat Zāyid is the largest town and the administrative centre of Al Dhafra, the westernmost and largest region in the Emirate of Abu Dhabi. The township was established in 1968 by Sheikh Zayed bin Sultan Al Nahyan, the late Ruler of Abu Dhabi and President of the United Arab Emirates. In 2005 census, the city had 29,095 inhabitants.

Location
The principal road is E45, which connects the town with the E11 in the north and the Liwa Oasis in the south. Another main road leads to Ghayathi.

Sports
Madinat Zayed is home to Al Dhafra FC, a team that competes in the UAE top division football league, the UAE Pro League, and Al Dhafra futsal club.

See also
 Al Ain, administrative centre of the Eastern Region
 Ghuwaifat

References

External links
 Projects in Madinat Zayed and Liwa, Western Region of Abu Dhabi
 Madinat Zayed

Populated places in the Emirate of Abu Dhabi
Western Region, Abu Dhabi
Populated places established in 1968